Déjà Vu is a 2015 Chinese comedy film directed by Huang Wei. It was released on January 23, 2015.

Cast
Liu Yang
Xia Yan
Jampa Tseten

Reception
By January 23, the film had earned CN¥240,000 at the Chinese box office.

References

2015 comedy films
Chinese comedy films